Brett B. Moffitt (born August 7, 1992) is an American professional stock car racing driver. He competes full-time in the NASCAR Xfinity Series, driving the No. 25 Ford Mustang for AM Racing.

He won Rookie of the Year Honors in 2015 in the NASCAR Cup Series and won the 2018 NASCAR Camping World Truck Series Championship.

Racing career

Early years

Moffitt began his racing career at the age of 10 in kart racing competition. In 2007, Moffitt won the Harris Clash in the IMCA Sport Modified division.  Following several years of competition in karts and dirt track racing, Moffitt began competing on asphalt in 2008, driving in the American Speed Association's Late Model North Series. He made his debut in NASCAR touring series competition in 2009, driving in the K&N Pro Series East – then known as the Camping World East Series – for a team owned by Andy Santerre; winning the pole in his first race at Greenville-Pickens Speedway, he became the youngest driver ever to do so in the series. He went on to score two wins over the course of the season, finishing the year third in series points. His first win, in the fourth race of the season at South Boston Speedway in May, made Moffitt the youngest driver ever to win in the series, and the youngest to win in any NASCAR touring series; the mark stood until the following season, when it was eclipsed by Darrell Wallace Jr. in March 2010.

Toyota development
For the 2010 season, Moffitt moved to Joe Gibbs Racing; he scored two wins during the year on his way to finishing second in points at the end of the season. In 2011, he drove as a development driver for Michael Waltrip Racing, winning three times throughout the K&N Pro Series East season and finishing third in the series standings.

For 2012, Moffitt changed teams again, moving to  Hattori Racing Enterprises, owned by former IndyCar and Truck Series driver Shigeaki Hattori. He won races at Richmond International Raceway and Central Pennsylvania Speedway, and led the series points after nine events of the fourteen-race season. A lack of sponsorship funding from HRE meant that for the final races of the season, starting at New Hampshire, the team associated with Michael Waltrip Racing to field Moffitt's car. He nearly won the 2012 K&N Pro Series East Championship, and was leading the final lap of the race and made contact with eventual winner Tyler Reddick, Moffitt crashed and lost the championship to Kyle Larson.

In August 2012, Moffitt made his debut in the NASCAR Nationwide Series, driving for RAB Racing at Iowa Speedway in the U.S. Cellular 250. He finished ninth in the event.

In 2013, Moffitt again Drove the K&N Pro Series East with Hattori Racing Enterprises. Moffit scored 5 top 5 finishes, and 10 top tens in 14 races and finished the season runner up in championship points.

Moffit was employed as a test driver for Michael Waltrip Racing. He made his Sprint Cup Series debut with the MWR-affiliated Identity Ventures Racing in the 2014 FedEx 400. Moffitt ran for IVR again at Michigan, Indianapolis, Bristol, Atlanta, Charlotte, Texas, and the season finale at Homestead.

In 2015, Moffitt drove in the No. 55 at Atlanta because MWR's regular driver Brian Vickers had off-season surgery to repair a patch placed over a hole in his heart. Moffitt played an impressive race, leading 1 lap, spending some time up in the top ten, and ultimately finished 8th for his first-ever Sprint Cup top ten. Moffitt returned to the No. 55 at Fontana due to Vickers being sidelined with more blood clots, also declaring for Rookie of the Year at this time.  He returned to the 55 at Martinsville and Texas.

Moffitt drove the No. 34 for Front Row Motorsports at Las Vegas and Phoenix because their regular driver David Ragan drove for Joe Gibbs Racing while JGR driver Kyle Busch was injured. It was announced that Moffitt will again replace Vickers for the next 5 races as he takes blood thinner medication and cannot race while using it. Moffitt was then replaced by Michael Waltrip for the Talladega race. Ragan became the driver of the 55 at the Kansas race, after Erik Jones took over the 18 ride. Later, in the week, Front Row Motorsports announced that Moffitt would return to the team at Kansas and become the primary driver of the 34 for the rest of the 2015 season except at Sonoma, Watkins Glen, and Talladega.

Moffitt ended up running 31 races and won the 2015 NASCAR Cup Series Rookie of the Year honors over contenders Jeb Burton, Matt DiBenedetto, and Alex Kennedy.

On December 10, 2015, it was learned that Moffitt would not return to the No. 34 Ford Fusion in 2016, being replaced by 2015 NASCAR Xfinity Series champion Chris Buescher for the 2016 season.

2016–present
In 2016, Moffitt was picked up by Red Horse Racing to race at Kentucky in the No. 11 Toyota Tundra. He started 2nd and finished 31st after blowing an engine. Moffitt returned to the truck for Pocono and Bristol and finished 3rd and 2nd respectively. On August 27, Moffitt won at Michigan in his fourth start in the No. 11 (and sixth career start) after passing both William Byron and Red Horse Racing teammate Timothy Peters on the final lap of the Career For Veterans 200. Moffitt also made a fifth start in the No. 11 at Canadian Tire Motorsport Park finishing 16th. Matt Tifft, the driver Moffitt was substituting for, returned to the 11 at Chicagoland Speedway after recovering from brain surgery earlier that year.

On February 17, 2017, it was announced that Moffitt would drive the first two races for Red Horse in 2017, behind the wheel of the No. 7. Moffitt was looking to run the full schedule, but on May 22, team owner Tom DeLoach announced the closure of Red Horse until sponsorship can be found, leaving Moffitt and teammate Timothy Peters without rides; at the time of the team's shutdown, Moffitt was tenth in points. In July, Moffitt joined GMS Racing's No. 96 team for his Xfinity Series return at Iowa Speedway. A month later, he signed with BK Racing to run the Cup races at Watkins Glen and Michigan in the team's No. 83 Camry. In September, Moffitt and BK formed an agreement for him to race for the team through the remainder of the season.

In 2018, it was announced that Moffitt would be driving the No. 16 truck full-time for Hattori Racing Enterprises. In the second race of the season at Atlanta, a caution came out to set up an overtime restart. After pit stops, Moffitt lined up third behind new race leader Myatt Snider. On the restart, Moffitt went three-wide into turn one and took the lead. Moffitt ended up pulling away to get the win, in a move reminiscent of the one he made to get his first Truck Series win in the 2016 Michigan race. Another win came in early summer at Iowa, where Moffitt outdueled Noah Gragson. The win solidified Moffitt's playoff positioning, which had been in danger when the team almost didn't go to Texas earlier in the season (NASCAR rules mandate a driver starts all races to be eligible for the playoffs); concerns about the team missing the Chicagoland race in late June were also raised, which would have forfeited his playoff eligibility. However, FR8Auctions.com announced they would sponsor him at Chicagoland and Kentucky. At Chicagoland, John Hunter Nemechek ran out of fuel on the last lap, allowing Moffitt to win his third race of the season. At Michigan, Moffitt fought in the closing laps for the lead with Johnny Sauter, before being able to make a last-lap pass coming off the final turns to eek past Sauter for his fourth win of the season. Moffitt made another late-race pass on a restart at ISM Raceway to win his fifth race of the season and lock himself into the Championship 4 at Homestead-Miami Speedway. He would then win the next week at Homestead, winning his first championship in the process.

On December 6, 2018, Moffitt was released by Hattori Racing Enterprises since the team needed to secure a driver who can bring funding for the 2019 season. On January 10, 2019, it was announced that Moffitt will replace Johnny Sauter as the driver of the GMS Racing No. 24 Chevrolet. The deal started when GMS president Mike Beam contacted Moffitt around the 2018 winter holidays; Moffitt previously had lower-tier offers on the table from teams who hoped to replicate the elevation in success that Moffitt brought HRE in 2018.

Despite not leading a lap and finishing second in June's 2019 M&M's 200 at Iowa, Moffitt was declared the winner after unofficial winner Ross Chastain's truck failed post race inspection, thus making Moffitt the declared winner. Moffitt became the first winner to achieve a win like this in any of the Top 3 series since Dale Jarrett was disqualified from a Busch Series victory in 1995. Moffitt also became the first race winner in any NASCAR series to achieve a victory in this way since NASCAR Whelen Euro Series driver Lucas Lasserre was awarded the victory at the second Elite 1 race at Franciacorta in 2018 after initial race winner Alon Day was disqualified for failing post-race inspection. Moffitt scored the first playoff win at Bristol. He then scored off a very dominant victory at Canadian Tire Motorsport Park in Canada, in which he led all but 19 laps of the race, holding off Alex Tagliani for the win. He qualified for the Truck Series Championship Round, where he finished third.

In 2020, Moffitt joined Our Motorsports for what was intended to be a four-race Xfinity schedule, but he eventually drove full-time except Bristol, which Patrick Emerling drove, Homestead R2, where he was scheduled to drive but replaced by JA Junior Avila, and Road America and Daytona RC, which were run by road course ringer Andy Lally.  In the Truck Series, Moffitt did not win a race until the playoff event at Kansas, where he held off GMS Racing teammate Zane Smith to clinch a spot in the final round. Moffitt led much of the championship race at Phoenix, but elected to stay out after a caution with two laps remaining, resulting in him falling back on the final restart as he finished tenth and third in the standings.

Moffitt left GMS after 2020 and joined Niece Motorsports for the 2021 Truck Series season. He also returned to Our and the Xfinity Series on a full-time basis in 2021, though he declared for Truck points. On April 22, with him being 15th in the Truck standings while seeing improvements at Our, Moffitt switched to Xfinity points. Despite the switch, he joined AM Racing for the Truck race at Knoxville in July.

In 2023, Moffitt would run full-time with AM Racing in the Xfinity Series, driving the No. 25 Ford.

Personal life
Moffitt was born August 7, 1992 in Grimes, Iowa. Moffitt is the youngest of three children to parents Dick and Becky Moffitt (née McDowell). He was homeschooled for his junior and senior years of high school.

In March 2020, Moffitt broke his femur in a motocross accident while riding with friends in North Carolina. He did not miss any Truck races during his recovery as the season had been on hiatus due to the COVID-19 pandemic.

Motorsports career results

NASCAR
(key) (Bold – Pole position awarded by qualifying time. Italics – Pole position earned by points standings or practice time. * – Most laps led. ** – All laps led.)

Monster Energy Cup Series

Xfinity Series

Camping World Truck Series

K&N Pro Series East

K&N Pro Series West

 Season still in progress
 Ineligible for series points
 Moffitt started the 2021 season running for Truck Series points, but switched to the Xfinity Series starting at Talladega in April.

ARCA Re/Max Series
(key) (Bold – Pole position awarded by qualifying time. Italics – Pole position earned by points standings or practice time. * – Most laps led.)

References

External links
 
 

 

Living people
1992 births
People from Polk County, Iowa
Racing drivers from Des Moines, Iowa
Racing drivers from Iowa
NASCAR drivers
ARCA Menards Series drivers
Joe Gibbs Racing drivers
Michael Waltrip Racing drivers
NASCAR Truck Series champions
ARCA Midwest Tour drivers
JR Motorsports drivers